Moalagh Bridge or  Amol Suspension Bridge and Noo Bridge and Felezi Bridge is a bridge in Amol, Iran. The bridge was built in the Pahlavi era on Haraz River by German engineers. The bridge was built in 1959. The Moalagh Bridge is a valuable monument of Mazandaran, connecting East and West Amol city.

References

Sources
 General Specifications of Mazandaran Province - Ministry of Industry
 Persia and the Persian Question - Page 381
 Structural Identification of Bridges (Case Study: Mazandaran, Iran) by J. Civil
 Iran. Ediz. Inglese Book
 Architecture of Iran bridges

Arch bridges
Bridges in Iran
Tourist attractions in Amol
Tourist attractions in Mazandaran Province